Star Wars Miniatures Battles is a tabletop wargame produced by West End Games in 1989.

Publication history
The game was first produced by West End Games in 1989 and republished in a 2nd edition version in 1990. West End Games lost the license to produce any more "Star Wars" games in 1999, and the license was subsequently picked up by Wizards of the Coast the following year. Star Wars Miniatures Battles should not be confused with WOTC's Star Wars Miniatures.

Star Wars Miniatures Battles core rulebook was written by Stephen Crane and Paul Murphy, published by West End Games in January 1989. The rules included are for playing battles using the metal miniatures produced by West End Games. The stats included in the book can be easily converted to use with its Star Wars role-playing game

The Star Wars Miniatures Battles Companion, published in 1994, was the first supplement and added vehicle rules and flight rules to the game. It also included errata and rules revisions, as well as new and optional rules, new equipment, a section detailing unit insignia and organization, and a collection of game scenarios.

The Imperial Entanglements book, published in 1996, was primarily a scenario supplement, but also contained updated errata and new squad stats.

Both the core rulebook and companion were repackaged in two boxed sets along with some miniatures, The Star Wars Miniatures Battles Starter Set and Star Wars Vehicles Starter Set respectively. A third set, the Mos Eisley Adventure Set which was targeted primarily to the RPG aspect, included not only some miniatures and maps, but a small supplement with a Miniatures Battles scenario. Also, the short run series of the Star Wars Adventure Journal had a few articles pertaining to the miniatures rules.

Reception
It was winner of the 1991 Origins Award for Best New Miniatures Rules.

Reviews
Challenge #58
White Wolf #27 (June/July, 1991)
White Wolf #31 (May/June, 1992)
White Wolf #46 (Aug., 1994)

References

External links

Board games introduced in 1989
Miniature wargames
Origins Award winners
Science fiction board wargames
Star Wars games
West End Games games
Wargames introduced in the 1980s